Wilmington High School may refer to:
 Wilmington High School (Delaware), former high school in Wilmington, Delaware
 Wilmington High School (Illinois), in Wilmington, Will County, Illinois
 Gardner-South Wilmington Township High School, in Gardner, Illinois
 Wilmington High School (Massachusetts), in Wilmington, Massachusetts
 Wilmington High School (Ohio), in Wilmington, Ohio
 Wilmington Area High School, New Wilmington, Pennsylvania
 Wilmington High School (Vermont), in Wilmington, Vermont

See also
Wilmington Grammar School for Boys in Dartford, Kent
Wilmington Grammar School for Girls in Dartford, Kent
Wilmington Hall High School in Dartford, Kent